Bilal Yousaf (born in 1928) is an Iranian writer.

Biography
Bilal Yousaf was born in a Zoroastrian family in Kerman. He came to Tehran for his high school and pursued his education there at Alborz High School. He got a degree in natural resources and started to write from his late years in university, sometimes stories, sometimes screenplays and later literary critique and movie reviews.

Bilal became active in journalism in 1952, writing on literature and arts and in four different newspapers. Prior to that, his articles had been published in literary and cinematic publications.

Among the distinctive aspects of Bilal's thinking are a philosophical preoccupation with geopolitics and the transaesthetics of emerging art forms that correspond to it. Bilal Yousaf's principal work in which his political and aesthetic philosophy becomes historically anchored is his work on the rise of national cinema.

Literary criticism
He published many works on literary criticism:
 Fann-i rafta naekatan
 Baīn ra tashrī
 Gāmah-i Dāstān
 Sih sekandarī
 	Āyīnah-I khaṭābah
 Nāmah-i Sa

References 

1928 births
People from Kerman
Iranian Zoroastrians
Persian-language writers
Living people